Ashland is a village in the northernmost portion of Natchitoches Parish, Louisiana, United States. A few residences and a convenience store to the north spill over into neighboring Bienville Parish. The population was 291 at the 2000 census but declined 9 percent to 269 in 2010. The median age was 45.7 years. Ashland is part of the Natchitoches Micropolitan Statistical Area but is located nearly forty miles to the north of the parish seat of Natchitoches.

The Ashland mayor is Donna Holland Horn. The village council consists of two No Party members, Juanita Calhoun and Dorie Harp, and a Republican, Terry Chesser. The police chief is Fred Holland, a Democrat. All of the Ashland town officials were unopposed for new terms in the primary election held on October 2, 2010.

Geography

Climate
Climate is characterized by relatively high temperatures and evenly distributed precipitation throughout the year.  According to the Köppen Climate Classification system, Ashland has a humid subtropical climate, abbreviated "Cfa" on climate maps.

Demographics

2020 census

As of the 2020 United States census, there were 194 people, 77 households, and 57 families residing in the village.

2000 census
As of the census of 2000, there were 291 people, 121 households, and 87 families residing in the village. The population density was 10.7 inhabitants per square mile (4.1/km). There were 149 housing units at an average density of 5.5 per square mile (2.1/km). The racial makeup of the village was 86.60% White, 10.31% African American, 2.41% Native American and 0.69% Asian. Hispanic or Latino of any race were 1.72% of the population.

There were 121 households, out of which 27.3% had children under the age of 18 living with them, 57.0% were married couples living together, 14.9% had a female householder with no husband present, and 27.3% were non-families. 25.6% of all households were made up of individuals, and 15.7% had someone living alone who was 65 years of age or older. The average household size was 2.40 and the average family size was 2.88.

In the village, the population was spread out, with 21.3% under the age of 18, 8.2% from 18 to 24, 26.5% from 25 to 44, 24.7% from 45 to 64, and 19.2% who were 65 years of age or older. The median age was 40 years. For every 100 females, there were 98.0 males. For every 100 females age 18 and over, there were 86.2 males.

The median income for a household in the village was $23,438, and the median income for a family was $31,875. Males had a median income of $27,083 versus $23,750 for females. The per capita income for the village was $12,652. About 33.7% of families and 32.0% of the population were below the poverty line, including 38.1% of those under the age of eighteen and 30.4% of those 65 or over.

References

Villages in Natchitoches Parish, Louisiana
Villages in Bienville Parish, Louisiana
Villages in Louisiana
1963 establishments in Louisiana
Populated places in Ark-La-Tex